Geoffrey Coker Arding Adams (24 May 1909 – 10 February 1998) was an English first-class cricketer and newspaper director.

Adams was born in Hampstead, London, and educated at Radley College and Pembroke College, Cambridge. A right-handed batsman and right-arm medium-pace bowler, he played for Hampshire between 1928 and 1930. In 33 first-class innings, Adams' highest score was 42 against Glamorgan in 1929.

He moved to Australia, where he built a newspaper group in regional Victoria.

References

External links
 
 Geoffrey Adams at Cricket Archive

1909 births
1998 deaths
English cricketers
Hampshire cricketers
People from Hampstead
People educated at Radley College
Alumni of Pembroke College, Cambridge
English emigrants to Australia
Australian expatriate sportspeople in England